The Mysore–Varanasi Express is an Express train belonging to the South Western Railway zone in India.

Service

The 16229/Mysuru–Varanasi Express has an average speed of 51 km/hr and covers 2708 km in 52h 40m. 16230/Varanasi–Mysuru Express has an average speed of 50 km/hr and covers 2708 km in 52h 40m.

Schedule

Reversals
GTL –

Route and halts 

The important halts of the train are:

 
 
 
 Tumkur
 
 
 Chitradurga
 
  (reversal)
 
 
 

 
 Ahmednagar
 Kopargaon
 
 
 

 
 Pipariya
 Narsinghpur

Coach composition

The train has brand new LHB rakes with max speed of 110 kmph. The train consists of 21 coaches:

 1 AC II Tier
 3 AC III Tier
 8 Sleeper coaches 
 7 General
 2 Generators cum Luggage/parcel van

Traction

Both trains are hauled by a Krishnarajapuram Loco Shed-based WDM-3A or WDP-4 diesel locomotive from Mysore to Varanasi and vice versa.

Direction reversal

Train reverses its direction once:

See also 

 Varanasi Junction railway station
 Mysore Junction railway station
 Bhagmati Express

Notes

External links 

 16229/Mysuru–Varanasi Express India Rail Info
 16230/Varanasi–Mysuru Express India Rail Info

References 

Passenger trains originating from Varanasi
Transport in Mysore
Express trains in India
Rail transport in Andhra Pradesh
Rail transport in Telangana
Rail transport in Karnataka
Rail transport in Maharashtra
Rail transport in Madhya Pradesh
Railway services introduced in 2014